Scalidophora is a group of marine pseudocoelomate protostomes that was proposed on morphological grounds to unite three phyla: the Kinorhyncha, the Priapulida and the Loricifera. The three phyla have four characters in common — chitinous cuticle that is moulted, rings of scalids on the introvert, flosculi, and two rings of introvert retracts. However, the monophyly of the Scalidophora was not supported by two molecular studies, where the position of the Loricifera was uncertain or as sister to the Panarthropoda. Both studies supported a reduced Scalidophora comprising the Kinorhyncha and Priapulida as sister phyla. Their closest relatives are the Panarthropoda, Nematoda and Nematomorpha; thus, they are placed in the group Ecdysozoa.

The two species in the genus Markuelia, known from fossilized embryos from the middle Cambrian, are thought to be stem Scalidophorans.

The group has also been considered a single group, Cephalorhyncha, with three classes.

The group is named after the spines (scalids) covering the introvert (head that can be retracted into the trunk).

References

Ecdysozoa taxa
Protostome unranked clades